Hell-Ship Morgan is a 1936 American romantic drama film directed by D. Ross Lederman and written by Harold Shumate.

Cast
 George Bancroft as Captain Ira 'Hell-Ship' Morgan
 Ann Sothern as Mary Taylor
 Victor Jory as Jim Allen
 George Regas as Covanci
 Howard Hickman as Cabot
 Ralph Byrd as Dale
 Rollo Lloyd as Hawkins
 Fred Toones as Ship Cook Pittsburgh
 Harry Bradley as Minister
 Helen Lynch as Waterfront Cafe Girl

References

External links

 

1936 films
1936 romantic drama films
American romantic drama films
American black-and-white films
1930s English-language films
Films directed by D. Ross Lederman
Columbia Pictures films
1930s American films